The Måløy Bridge is a cantilever road bridge in Kinn Municipality in Vestland county, Norway. The bridge connects the village area of Degnepoll on the mainland and the town of Måløy on the island of Vågsøy. The bridge carries Norwegian national road 15 over the Måløystraumen strait and Måløy island. In total, the bridge has 34 spans.

Construction started in 1971, and it was officially opened by King Olav V on 11 July 1974, although the bridge was actually opened for traffic in December 1973. King Olav came to the opening by ship, returning from a visit to Iceland. The opening of the bridge had to be postponed for a day because the Royal Yacht got delayed by bad weather while at sea. The Måløy Bridge was the longest bridge in Norway at the time of its opening. It cost  to construct and was a toll bridge until 1984. There are boards on each side of the bridge showing the amount of wind, and the bridge has been closed several times because of strong winds.

See also
List of bridges in Norway
List of bridges in Norway by length
List of bridges
List of bridges by length

References

External links
A page about the history of the bridge 
A picture of the bridge
Webcam at the bridge
The World's Longest Tunnel Page (bridge section)

Bridges in Vestland
Bridges completed in 1973
Cantilever bridges
Kinn
1973 establishments in Norway
Former toll bridges in Norway